Jasper Place, originally named West Jasper Place, is a former town in Alberta, Canada now within the City of Edmonton. Prior to amalgamation with Edmonton, the town was bounded by 149 Street to the east, 118 Avenue to the north, 170 Street to the west and the North Saskatchewan River to the south. Its former municipal centre, which included its town hall, fire station and Butler Memorial Park, was located at Stony Plain Road and 157 Street. It was known as West Jasper Place from 1910 to 1950.

History 
West Jasper Place was subdivided in approximately 1910. In its early days, the community was home to a few hundred homesteaders, who lived a meagre life raising a few animals and tending gardens. Houses lacked the amenities of modern life, including electricity, flush toilets, and running water. Water was trucked out to residents at a cost of $1.25 per 500 gallons.

During the 1930s, the population grew as many Edmontonians moved out to Jasper Place to escape high taxes in the city.  Many residents worked in Edmonton, and by the 1940s the trolley line extended to the modern 149 Street, close enough to Jasper Place to allow returning workers to walk the rest of the way home.

Following the Second World War and the discovery of oil near Leduc in 1947, the population of Edmonton swelled and West Jasper Place absorbed some of that population growth. By 1948 it was the largest hamlet in Alberta, with a population of 4,000. It incorporated as the Village of West Jasper Place on December 31, 1949, and its name was shortened to Jasper Place a few months later on March 15, 1950. Jasper Place instantly became the largest village in Alberta, with a population of 8,900, more than a doubling of the community in just two years. Village status only lasted a few months as the community was incorporated as the Town of Jasper Place on November 6, 1950.

In the early 1960s, to accommodate continuing growth, Jasper Place expanded several schools, including Jasper Place Composite High School, began construction of a sports centre (football bowl, indoor swimming pool, indoor ice hockey arena), and commenced planning the original Meadowlark Park Shopping Centre.  Projects such as these placed the town deeply in debt and, with little industrial base, an increasing demand for services by the growing population, the province refusing to grant extra funds, and the large City of Edmonton already touching the town's boundary along the east side of 149 Street, Jasper Place's independence as its own municipality was at risk.

In 1962, the Jasper Place Town Council moved to amalgamate into Edmonton, with a plebiscite held on October 17, 1962, in which a majority of residents voted in favour of amalgamation. Amalgamation occurred on August 17, 1964. "With amalgamation, the City of Edmonton assumed Jasper Place's bonded indebtedness of $8.177 million (equivalent to $ million in ), the town's infrastructure and responsibility for all public services such as sewer, water and transportation." At amalgamation, Jasper Place was the largest town in Canada, with a population of 37,429 – having grown nearly 950% from when it was a hamlet in 1948.

Demographics

See also 
List of former urban municipalities in Alberta

References 

1949 establishments in Alberta
1964 disestablishments in Alberta
Former municipalities now in Edmonton
Former towns in Alberta
Localities in Edmonton